The separation of Panama from Colombia was formalized on 3 November 1903, with the establishment of the Republic of Panama.  From the Independence of Panama from Spain in 1821, Panama had simultaneously declared independence from Spain and joined itself to the confederation of Gran Colombia through the Independence Act of Panama.  Panama was always tenuously connected to the rest of the country to the south, owing to its remoteness from the government in Bogotá and lack of a practical overland connection to the rest of Gran Colombia.  In 1840–41, a short-lived independent republic was established under Tomás de Herrera.  After rejoining Colombia following a 13-month independence, it remained a province which saw frequent rebellious flare-ups, notably the Panama crisis of 1885, which saw the intervention of the United States Navy, and a reaction by the Chilean Navy.

During the construction of the Panama canal, the initial attempts by France to construct a sea-level canal across the isthmus were secured through treaty with Colombia; however French cost overruns and corruption in the Panama scandals led to abandonment of the Canal for a decade.  During the intervening years, local separatists used the political instability of the Thousand Days' War to agitate for political separation from Colombia and establishment of an independent republic.  When the United States sought to take over the canal project, the government of Colombia proved difficult to work with, and with the cooperation of French financier Philippe-Jean Bunau-Varilla, Panama simultaneously declared independence from Colombia and negotiated a treaty granting the U.S. the right to construct the canal.

The United States was the first country to recognize the independence of the nascent republic, sending the U.S. Navy to prevent Colombia from retaking the territory during the first days of the new Republic.  In exchange for its role in defending the Republic, and for constructing the canal, the U.S. was granted a perpetual lease on the land around the canal, known as the Panama Canal Zone, which was later returned to Panama under the terms of the Torrijos–Carter Treaties.

After the United States, many other nations quickly recognized the independent republic, though Colombia refused to do so until 1909, after receiving a $500,000 concession from Panama to cover its share of the debts it owed at independence.

Prelude
After it achieved independence from Spain on November 28, 1821, Panama became a part of the Republic of Gran Colombia which consisted of today's Colombia, Venezuela, Panama, and most of Ecuador.

The political struggle between federalists and centralists that followed independence from Spain resulted in a changing administrative and jurisdictional status for Panama. Under centralism Panama was established as the Department of the Isthmus and during federalism as the Sovereign State of Panama.

1885 crisis

An 1846 treaty between Colombia and the United States, the Mallarino–Bidlack Treaty, pledged the United States to maintain "neutrality" in Panama in exchange for transit rights in the isthmus on behalf of Colombia. In March 1885 Colombia thinned its military presence in Panama, sending troops stationed there to fight rebels in other provinces. These favourable conditions prompted an insurgency in Panama. The United States Navy was sent there to keep order, in spite of invoking its obligations according to the treaty of 1846.

In 1885 the United States occupied the city of Colón, Panama. Chile, which at that time had the strongest fleet in the Americas, sent the cruiser  to occupy Panama City in response. Esmeraldas captain was ordered to stop by any means an eventual annexation of Panama by the United States.

Thousand Days' War
The Thousand Days' War (1899–1902) was one of the many armed struggles between the Liberal and Conservative Parties which devastated Colombia, including Panama, during the 19th century. This new civil war ended with the signing of the Treaty of Wisconsin.  However, the Liberal leader Victoriano Lorenzo refused to accept the terms of the agreement and was executed on May 15, 1903.

On July 25, 1903, the headquarters of the Panamanian newspaper El Lápiz were assaulted by orders of the military commander for Panama, General José Vásquez Cobo, brother of the then Colombian Minister of War, as a retaliation for the publication of a detailed article narrating the execution and protests in Panama. This event damaged the trust of Panamanian liberals in the Conservative government based in Bogotá, and they later joined the separatist movement.

In 1903, the United States and Colombia signed the Hay–Herrán Treaty to finalize the construction of the Panama Canal but the process was not completed because the Congress of Colombia rejected the measure (which the Colombian government had proposed) on August 12, 1903. The United States then moved to support the separatist movement in Panama to gain control over the remnants of the French attempt at building a canal.

Separation

Panamanian politician José Domingo De Obaldía was selected for the Governor of the Isthmus of Panama office that he had previously held, and was supported by separatist movements. Another Panamanian politician named José Agustín Arango began to plan the revolution and separation. The separatists wanted to negotiate the construction of the Panama Canal directly with the United States due to the negativity of the Colombian government.

The separatist network was formed by Arango, Dr. Manuel Amador Guerrero, General Nicanor de Obarrio, Ricardo Arias, Federico Boyd, Carlos Constantino Arosemena, Tomás Arias, Manuel Espinosa Batista and others. Amador Guerrero was in charge of going to the United States to get support for the separatist plan; he also gained the support of important Panamanian liberal leaders and the support of another military commander, Esteban Huertas.

With strong support the separatist movement set November 1903 as the time for the separation. However, rumors in Colombia spread but the information managed by the government of Colombia indicated that Nicaragua was planning to invade a region of northern Panama known as the Calovébora. The Government deployed troops from the Tiradores Battalion from Barranquilla, and instructed the commander to take over the functions of the Governor of Panama José Domingo de Obaldía and General Esteban Huertas, whom the government did not trust.

The Tiradores Battalion was led by Generals Juan Tovar and Ramón Amaya and arrived in the Panamanian city of Colón the morning of November 3, 1903. It suffered delays on its way to Panama City caused by the complicity of the Panama Railway authorities who sympathized with the separatist movement. On arrival in Panama City, the troops were put under the command of Col. Eliseo Torres. General Huertas commander of the Colombia Battalion in Panama ordered the arrest of Tovar and his other officials.

The Colombian gunboat Bogotá fired shells upon Panama City the night of November 3, causing injuries and mortally wounding Mr. Wong Kong Yee of Hong Sang, China. He was the only casualty of independence.

A United States Navy gunboat, commanded by Commander John Hubbard, who had also helped to delay the disembarkation of the Colombian troops in Colón, continued to interfere with their mission by insisting that the "neutrality" of the railway had to be respected.

With the suppression of the Colombian troops, the Revolutionary Junta declared the secession of the Isthmus and later its independence, with the declaration of the Republic of Panama. A naval squadron in the Bay of Panama was captured without resistance.

Demetrio H. Brid president of the Municipal Council of Panama became the de facto President of Panama and on November 4, 1903 appointed a Provisional Government Junta, which governed the country until February 1904 and the Constituent National Convention. The convention elected Manuel Amador Guerrero as first constitutional president. News of the separation of Panama from Colombia reached Bogotá only on November 6, 1903 due to a problem with the submarine cables.

Reactions

On November 13, 1903, the United States formally recognized the Republic of Panama (after recognizing it unofficially on November 6 and 7). On November 18, 1903, the United States Secretary of State John Hay and Philippe-Jean Bunau-Varilla signed the Hay–Bunau-Varilla Treaty. No Panamanians signed the treaty, although Bunau-Varilla was present as the diplomatic representative of Panama (a role he had purchased through financial assistance to the rebels), even though he had not lived in Panama for seventeen years prior to independence, and  never returned afterwards. The treaty was later approved by the Panamanian government and the Senate of the United States.

The ambassador of Colombia in Ecuador Emiliano Isaza was informed of the situation in Panama but did not inform his government to prevent a revolt in Bogotá. The government of Colombia then sent a diplomatic mission to Panama in an effort to make them reconsider by suggesting an approval by the senate of Colombia if they reconsidered the Hay–Herrán Treaty instead of the Hay–Bunau-Varilla Treaty and also proposed making Panama City the capital of Colombia.

The mission met aboard the ship  with the Panamanian delegation formed by Constantino Arosemena, Tomás Arias and Eusebio A. Morales, which rejected all proposals. Colombia then sent later a delegation of prominent politicians and political figures; General Rafael Reyes, Pedro Nel Ospina, Jorge Holguín and Lucas Caballero who met with the same representative for Panama and Carlos Antonio Mendoza, Nicanor de Obarrio y Antonio Zubieta, without reaching any consensus.

Panama's independence alarmed Chilean authorities about a growing influence of the United States. This made Chile put great efforts to deny a United States purchase of the Galápagos Islands or the establishment of a United States Guantanamo-like naval base there. Chilean diplomacy was backed by Germany and Britain on this issue.

Recognition

See also
 Postage stamps and postal history of the Canal Zone
 United States involvement in regime change
 Latin America–United States relations

References

Further reading
 Collin, Richard H. Theodore Roosevelt's Caribbean: The Panama Canal, the Monroe Doctrine & the Latin American Context (1990), 598pp. 
 Graham, Terence. The Interests of Civilization: Reaction in the United States Against the Seizure of the Panama Canal Zone, 1903-1904 (Lund studies in international history, 1985).
 Mellander, Gustavo A., Mellander, Nelly, Charles Edward Magoon: The Panama Years. Río Piedras, Puerto Rico: Editorial Plaza Mayor. ISBN 1-56328-155-4. OCLC 42970390, 1999)
 Mellander, Gustavo A., The United States in Panamanian Politics: The Intriguing Formative Years." Danville, Ill.: Interstate Publishers. OCLC 138568, 1971)
 Nikol, John, and Francis X. Holbrook, "Naval Operations in the Panama Revolution, 1903," American Neptune, 37 (1977), 253–261.
 Lafeber, Walter. The Panama Canal: The Crisis in Historical Perspective (3rd ed. 1990).
 Turk, Richard . "The United States Navy and the 'Taking of Panama, 1901-1903, Military Affairs 38 (1974), 92-96.

External links
  Luis Angel Arango Library - Separation of Panama
  Demetrio H. Brid Presidente de facto de la República - 1903

History of Colombia
History of Panama
Separatism in Colombia
Panama
1903 in Colombia
Colombia–Panama relations
Colombia–United States relations
1903 in Panama
Independence of Panama
November 1903 events
United States involvement in regime change
1890s in Panama
1900s in Panama